Agreement of Left Nationalists (ENE) was a Catalan socialist and nationalist political party, founded in 1985 by members of the Left Nationalists (NdE), Republican Left of Catalonia (ERC) and independents. In the 1984 Catalan parliamentary election, it ran under the label Agreement of the Catalan Left (EEC). In the 1986 Spanish general election, it ran together with the Unified Socialist Party of Catalonia (PSUC) within the Union of the Catalan Left coalition (UEC).

ENE failed to slightly improve on NdE electoral results, eventually merging with PSUC into UEC to form Initiative for Catalonia (IC).

1985 establishments in Spain
1987 disestablishments in Spain
Defunct nationalist parties in Spain
Catalan nationalist parties
Defunct socialist parties in Catalonia
Green political parties in Spain
Left-wing nationalist parties
Political parties disestablished in 1987
Political parties established in 1985